The ginger carpetshark (Parascyllium sparsimaculatum) is a species of carpetshark of the family Parascylliidae endemic to the waters off western Australia. It is a small fish at only  TL in length in females and harmless to humans. It is known from only three specimens, and so biological and population data are lacking. It is likely not under threat due to its depth range, but its limited range may make it vulnerable to fishing. Reproduction is oviparous and embryos feed solely on yolk.

References

 Compagno, Dando, & Fowler, Sharks of the World, Princeton University Press, New Jersey 2005

External links
 
 

ginger carpetshark
Marine fish of Western Australia
ginger carpetshark